Adrian Tismenar (Serbian Cyrillic: Адриан Тисменар: born January 31, 1981) is a retired Serbian footballer who played in the Serbian First League, Serbian League, Montenegrin First League and the Canadian Soccer League.

Playing career 
Tismenar began his career in 2005 with FK Mladi Radnik in the Serbian League East. In 2007, he signed with FK Mornar of the Montenegrin First League. In 2007, he returned to Serbia to play in the Serbian First League with FK Sevojno. In 2009, he went overseas to Canada to sign with the Serbian White Eagles of the Canadian Soccer League. In his debut season he clinched the regular season title for the club. He also featured in the CSL Championship finals match against Trois-Rivières Attak, but lost the match on penalties. In 2012, he returned to Serbia to play with FK Vršac, and the following season he returned to the CSL to sign with Brampton United.

References 

1981 births
Living people
People from Vršac
Serbian footballers
FK Mladi Radnik players
FK Mornar players
FK Sevojno players
Serbian White Eagles FC players
Brampton United players
Serbian people of Romanian descent
Montenegrin First League players
Serbian First League players
Canadian Soccer League (1998–present) players
Serbian expatriate footballers
Serbian expatriate sportspeople in Canada
Association football midfielders